Piano Duets: Live in Berlin 93/94 is an album by Aki Takase and Alexander von Schlippenbach.

Recording and music
The performances are by pianists Aki Takase and Alexander von Schlippenbach, who also produced the album. The first three tracks on the album were recorded at the Gethsemane-Kirche in Berlin, on 13 March 1993. The other tracks were recorded at DeutschlandRadio, Studio 10, also in Berlin, on 9 December 1994. "The Morlocks" and "Chapelure Japonaise" are played on prepared piano.

Release and reception

Piano Duets: Live in Berlin 93/94 was released by FMP. In a five-star review, AllMusic stated that "There is no jazz, no rock, no free improv, no classical, no blues, or new; all these distinctions lose their meaning the beginning this duo commences playing here. What is left is music, a sonorous organization of vibration in the air. [...] The listener is left literally breathless, unable to relax yet unable to move, except maybe toward the stereo to hit 'repeat'."

Track listing
"Na, Na, Na, Na... ist das der Weg?" (Alexander von Schlippenbach) – 11:40
"The Morlocks" (Schlippenbach) – 11:29
"You Are What You Is" (Frank Zappa) – 5:41
"Mysterioso (Thelonious Monk) – 4:01
"Ask Me Now" (Monk) – 2:18
"Pannonica" (Monk) – 1:32
"Evidence" (Monk) – 5:52
"Tales of Something" (Aki Takase) – 8:50
"Chapelure Japonaise" (Takase) – 10:23

Personnel
Aki Takase – piano
Alexander von Schlippenbach – piano

References

FMP Records live albums